The Blanche is a tributary of the left bank of the Acheneau and thus a sub-tributary of the Loire.

Etymology
The name, Blanche, meaning white in French, is thought to derive from the presence of white chalk in the water from the lime kilns around Arthon-en-Retz. Another hypothesis is that the name derives from the white mist over its related marshland.

Geography
La Blanche is located entirely in the Pays de Retz, south of the Loire in the department of Loire-Atlantique. It covers the municipalities of Chaumes-en-Retz ( Arthon-en-Retz and Chéméré), Saint-Hilaire-de-Chaléons, Cheix-en-Retz and Rouans.

Hydrography
After about 7km the river veers north and continues for 9km, fed by several streams from the west and east including the Ruisseau du Bois de Beaulieu at Pont Beranger. Its confluence with the Acheneau is in the marshes of the Marais de Cheix south of Cheix-en-Retz where it divides into two, the Vielle Blanche joining the Acheneau to Buzon while the Blanche continues to the west more channelled in a network of canals, joining the Acheneau further south-west of the town in the Marais d'Acheneau.

References

Blanche
Blanche
Blanche